"I Don't Give a Fuck" is a 1991 song by 2Pac featuring Pogo.

I Don't Give a Fuck may also refer to:

 "I Don't Give a Fuck", a song by Lil Jon & the East Side Boyz featuring Mystikal & Krayzie Bone from the album Kings of Crunk
 "I Don't Give a Fuk", a song by T-Pain from the album Revolver

See also 
 IDGAF (disambiguation)
 I Don't Give A (disambiguation)